Aechmea cathcartii is a plant species in the genus Aechmea. This species is endemic to the Miranda region of Venezuela.

References

cathcartii
Flora of Venezuela
Plants described in 1981